Robina Nicol (née Sinclair, 7 June 1861 – 17 July 1942) was a New Zealand photographer and suffragist.

Life
Nicol née Sinclair was born on 7 June 1861 in Shetland, Scotland. Her family emigrated to New Zealand in 1874. In 1885 she married Alexander Scott Nicol in Wellington, New Zealand.

Nicol was a photographer, capturing images of local people and places, especially many images of her family. Although considered an "amateur" because she did not pursue a career in photography, she was active in a time when there were few women photographers in New Zealand. Her photographs were digitised by the Alexander Turnbull Library. 

Nichol was a signer of the 1893 Women's Suffrage Petition which ultimately won women the right to vote.

Nichol died on 17 July 1942 in Wellington.

See also
 List of suffragists and suffragettes

References

External links
 
 The Ghostly World of Robina Nicol
 Turnbull archival collection

Further reading
The roundness of life: Domestic spaces and photography in Aotearoa New Zealand, Essay by Christine McFetridge for PhotoForum 2019

1861 births 
1942 deaths
Scottish emigrants to New Zealand
New Zealand suffragists 
New Zealand women photographers